Staromusino (İśke Musa) is a rural locality (a selo) in Chuvalkipovsky Selsoviet, Chishminsky District, Bashkortostan, Russia. The population was 578 as of 2010. There are 9 streets.

Geography 
Staromusino is located 35 km southeast of Chishmy (the district's administrative centre) by road. Abrayevo is the nearest rural locality.

References 

Rural localities in Chishminsky District